Yaşaroğlu or Yasaroglu is a Turkish surname. It is the patronymic of the masculine Turkish given name Yaşar (singular, third person conjugation of the Turkish verb yaşamak "to live" and therefore meaning "he/she/it lives"). People with the surname include:
 Ahmet Halit Yaşaroğlu (1891–1951), Turkish publisher
 Begüm Kütük Yaşaroğlu (born 1980), Turkish actress and model
 Erdil Yaşaroğlu (born  1971), Turkish caricaturist
 Varol Yaşaroğlu (born 1968), Turkish cartoonist

References

Turkish-language surnames
Patronymic surnames